James A. Strong (born November 16, 1954) is a former college football coach. He was the head coach at UNLV for four seasons, and served as an assistant coach and offensive coordinator at Notre Dame.

Strong joined head coach Lou Holtz' staff at Arkansas in 1983, and followed him to Minnesota and eventually Notre Dame. At Notre Dame, Strong had a successful tenure as offensive coordinator and offensive backfield coach, including the 1988 national championship season.  In December 1989, Strong was named the head coach of the football program at the University of Nevada, Las Vegas.  In making the hire, the UNLV Athletic Director asserted Strong's background in recruiting, his energy, and the success of Notre Dame.  His initial contract was for five-years at a salary of $95,000 a year.

Strong arrived at a UNLV program that had fallen under the shadow of the highly successful men's basketball program under Jerry Tarkanian; in his first meeting with the university Faculty Senate, he noted "They don't know us because we are a premier academic institution. We will be someday. But they know us because we've got a basketball team that won the national championship."

After leaving UNLV, Strong changed careers and became a real estate broker in Branson, Missouri.

Head coaching record

References

1954 births
Living people
Arkansas Razorbacks football coaches
Minnesota Golden Gophers football coaches
Missouri Southern Lions football players
Missouri Southern State University alumni
Notre Dame Fighting Irish football coaches
UNLV Rebels football coaches